Herbert Gordon (1898−1965) was an English first-class cricketer.

Herbert Gordon may also refer to:

Herbert Gordon (footballer) (1952−2013), Jamaican footballer